Ado is a local government area of Benue State, Nigeria and was created in 1991.  It is one of the 9 local government areas in the southern senatorial zone which is mainly occupied primarily by the Idoma and Igbo people of Benue State.  The administrative headquarters are at Igumale, situated on the railway line transversing the north-south of Nigeria.  The area contains mineral and natural resources in commercial quantities such as limestone, kaolin, petroleum and coal.  It is a culturally rich and diverse  area comprising the Agila/Apa, Ulayi, Ijigbam, Utonkon and Igumale, Ekile communities.  It was one of the first areas in Idoma to have contact with European missionaries, hence it had the first missionary school in the Idoma area (Methodist High School, Igumale). The Catholic Missionaries first came to Utonkon in Ado in 1922 where they established the St. Paul's Catholic Church (Parish) in Utonkon, the home of HRH, Late Amb. Dr. Edwin Ogebe Ogbu, the Ochi'doma III of Idoma, Hon. (Chief) Dennis Ekpe Ogbu, The Ogakwu K'Idoma, and Justice George I. Uloko (Rtd) a former Chief Commissioner, Public Complaints Commission, Nigeria.  Utonkon is the location of the defunct Apa State University and Igumale is the location of the Benue state cement factory.

It is also known for its rich agricultural soil, especially in the Agila area. They are best known for the large arm-sized yam tubers they produce as well as the abundance of ready-to-drop ripe orange trees and sweet palm wine.

References

Local Government Areas in Benue State